This is a list of 744 species in the genus Hylaeus, masked bees.

Hylaeus species

 Hylaeus aberrans (Bridwell, 1919) i c g
 Hylaeus abjunctus Cockerell, 1936 i c g
 Hylaeus aborigensis Dathe, 1994 i c g
 Hylaeus absolutus (Gribodo, 1894) i c g
 Hylaeus absonulus Cockerell, 1936 i c g
 Hylaeus abyssinicus (Alfken, 1905) i c g
 Hylaeus acariphorus Snelling, 1985 i c g
 Hylaeus accipitris (Cockerell, 1914) i c g
 Hylaeus acer Dathe, 1980 i c g
 Hylaeus adamauanis Dathe, 2015 g
 Hylaeus adriaticus (Warncke, 1972) i c g
 Hylaeus advocatus (Nurse, 1903) i c g
 Hylaeus aenigmus (Viereck, 1903) i c g
 Hylaeus affinis (Smith, 1853) i c g b
 Hylaeus agilis (Smith, 1876) i c g
 Hylaeus akoko Magnacca & Daly, 2003 i c g
 Hylaeus alampes Moure, 1942 i c g
 Hylaeus albocuneatus (Cockerell, 1913) i c g
 Hylaeus albomaculatus (Smith, 1879) i c g
 Hylaeus albonitens (Cockerell, 1905) i c g
 Hylaeus albonotatus (Walker, 1871) i c g
 Hylaeus albozebratus Michener, 1965 i c g
 Hylaeus alcyoneus (Erichson, 1842) i c g
 Hylaeus alexandrinus (Warncke, 1992) i c g
 Hylaeus alfkeni (Friese, 1913) i c g
 Hylaeus alocaspidus Snelling, 1975 i c g
 Hylaeus alpinus (Morawitz, 1867) i c g
 Hylaeus altaicus Dathe, 1986 i c g
 Hylaeus amatulus (Cockerell, 1922) i c g
 Hylaeus amatus (Cockerell, 1909) i c g
 Hylaeus amazonicus (Gribodo, 1894) i c g
 Hylaeus amelanocephalus Rayment, 1954 i c g
 Hylaeus ameliae Cockerell, 1942 i c g
 Hylaeus amharicus Dathe, 2014 g
 Hylaeus amiculiformis (Cockerell, 1909) i c g
 Hylaeus amiculinus (Cockerell, 1922) i c g
 Hylaeus amiculus (Smith, 1879) i c g
 Hylaeus ancoratus (Cockerell, 1912) i c g
 Hylaeus andrenoides (Perkins, 1899) i c g
 Hylaeus angustatus (Schenck, 1861) i c g
 Hylaeus angustifrons Morawitz, 1876 i c g
 Hylaeus angustulus (Perkins, 1899) i c g
 Hylaeus anmelanocephalus Rayment, 1954 i c g
 Hylaeus annularis (Kirby, 1802) i c g
 Hylaeus annulatus (Linnaeus, 1758) i c g b
 Hylaeus anomalus (Perkins, 1899) i c g
 Hylaeus anthracinus (Smith, 1853) i c g
 Hylaeus aralis (Cockerell, 1916) i c g
 Hylaeus araxanus (Warncke, 1981) i c g
 Hylaeus arenarius Morawitz, 1876 i c g
 Hylaeus armeniacus (Warncke, 1981) i c g
 Hylaeus arnoldi (Friese, 1913) i c g
 Hylaeus arsenicus (Vachal, 1901) i c g
 Hylaeus asiaticus (Dalla Torre, 1896) i c g
 Hylaeus asininus (Cockerell & Casad, 1895) i c g
 Hylaeus asper (Vachal, 1909) i c g
 Hylaeus asperithorax (Rayment, 1927) i c g
 Hylaeus aspricollis (Vachal, 1901) i c g
 Hylaeus assimulans (Perkins, 1899) i c g
 Hylaeus aterrimus (Friese, 1911) i c
 Hylaeus atriceps (Friese, 1911) i c g
 Hylaeus atripes (Vachal, 1901) i c g
 Hylaeus auriferus (Cockerell, 1918) i c g
 Hylaeus azorae (Warncke, 1992) i c g
 Hylaeus aztecus (Cresson, 1869) i c g
 Hylaeus bacillarius (Cockerell, 1914) i c g
 Hylaeus basalis (Smith, 1853) i c g b
 Hylaeus basilautus (Rayment, 1953) i c g
 Hylaeus basimacula (Cameron, 1904) i c g
 Hylaeus basirufus (Vachal, 1910) i c g
 Hylaeus baudinensis (Cockerell, 1905) i c g
 Hylaeus beaumonti (Benoist, 1943) i c g
 Hylaeus bellicosus (Cameron, 1897) i c g
 Hylaeus benguetensis (Cockerell, 1919) i c g
 Hylaeus benoisti Michener, 2000 i c g
 Hylaeus bequaerti (Schrottky, 1910) i c g
 Hylaeus bequaertianus Bridwell, 1919 i c g
 Hylaeus bernhardi Dathe, 2014 g
 Hylaeus bertonii (Schrottky, 1907) i c g
 Hylaeus bevisi (Cockerell, 1917) i c g
 Hylaeus biarmicus (Warncke, 1992) i c g
 Hylaeus bicoloratus (Smith, 1853) i c g
 Hylaeus bicolorellus Michener, 1965 i c g
 Hylaeus bicuneatus (Cockerell, 1910) i c g
 Hylaeus bidentatus (Smith, 1853) i c g
 Hylaeus bifasciatus (Jurine, 1807) i c g
 Hylaeus binotatus (Alfken, 1914) i c g
 Hylaeus binus (Vachal, 1909) i c g
 Hylaeus bipunctatus (Fabricius, 1798) i c g
 Hylaeus biscutellus (Vachal, 1909) i c g
 Hylaeus bituberculatus (Smith, 1879) i c g
 Hylaeus blanchae Rayment, 1953 i c g
 Hylaeus bolivianus (Schrottky, 1910) i c g
 Hylaeus boninensis Yasumatsu, 1955 i c g
 Hylaeus borchii Rayment, 1935 i c g
 Hylaeus borneensis (Cockerell, 1920) i c g
 Hylaeus bothros (Schrottky, 1910) i c g
 Hylaeus bouyssoui (Vachal, 1899) i c g
 Hylaeus brachycephalus (Morawitz, 1868) i c g
 Hylaeus brachyceratomerus (Moure, 1941) i c g
 Hylaeus brasiliensis (Schrottky, 1910) i c g
 Hylaeus braunsi (Alfken, 1905) i c g
 Hylaeus breviceps Morawitz, 1876 i c g
 Hylaeus brevicornis Nylander, 1852 i c g
 Hylaeus brevior (Cockerell, 1918) i c g
 Hylaeus breviradius (Vachal, 1901) i c g
 Hylaeus bridwelli Ikudome, 1989 i c g
 Hylaeus buddhae Meade-Waldo, 1923 i c g
 Hylaeus burnsi (Michener, 1965) i c
 Hylaeus caarendyensis (Schrottky, 1906) i c g
 Hylaeus callosulus Meade-Waldo, 1923 i c g
 Hylaeus callosus (Cockerell, 1910) i c g
 Hylaeus calvus (Metz, 1911) i c g b
 Hylaeus camerunensis Dathe, 2014 g
 Hylaeus canariensis Erlandsson, 1983 i c g
 Hylaeus capicola (Alfken, 1914) i c g
 Hylaeus capitosus (Smith, 1876) i c g
 Hylaeus cardioscapus Cockerell, 1924 i c g
 Hylaeus cecidonastes Moure, 1972 i c g
 Hylaeus ceniberus (Cockerell, 1910) i c g
 Hylaeus certus (Cockerell, 1921) i c g
 Hylaeus cervinus (Warncke, 1992) i c g
 Hylaeus chasanensis (Romankova, 1995) i c g
 Hylaeus chimani Dathe, 2014 g
 Hylaeus chlorosomus (Cockerell, 1913) i c g
 Hylaeus chlorostictus (Perkins, 1899) i c g
 Hylaeus chromaticus (Cockerell, 1912) i c g
 Hylaeus chrysaspis (Cockerell, 1910) i c g
 Hylaeus chukar (Warncke, 1992) i c g
 Hylaeus cinereus (Warncke, 1992) i c g
 Hylaeus claviger (Cockerell) g
 Hylaeus clavigerus (Cockerell, 1936) i c g
 Hylaeus cliffordiellus Rayment, 1953 i c g
 Hylaeus clypearis (Schenck, 1853) i c g
 Hylaeus cockerelli (Schrottky, 1906) i c g
 Hylaeus colei Rayment, 1935 i c g
 Hylaeus coloradensis (Cockerell, 1896) i c g
 Hylaeus communis Nylander, 1852 i c g
 Hylaeus concinnus Cockerell, 1924 i c g
 Hylaeus confluens (Smith, 1853) i c g
 Hylaeus conformis Förster, 1871 i c g
 Hylaeus confusus Nylander, 1852 i c g
 Hylaeus coniceps (Blackburn, 1886) i c g
 Hylaeus connectens (Perkins, 1899) i c g
 Hylaeus conspicuus (Metz, 1911) i c g
 Hylaeus constrictiformis (Cockerell, 1910) i c g
 Hylaeus constrictus (Cockerell, 1905) i c g
 Hylaeus contradictus (Cockerell, 1919) i c g
 Hylaeus convergens Dathe, 2000 i c g
 Hylaeus cookii (Metz, 1911) i c g
 Hylaeus coriaceus (Pérez, 1895) i c g
 Hylaeus cornutus Curtis, 1831 i c g
 Hylaeus coroicensis (Cockerell, 1918) i c g
 Hylaeus coronatulus (Cockerell, 1914) i c g
 Hylaeus coronatus (Cockerell, 1905) i c g
 Hylaeus costaricensis (Friese, 1917) i c
 Hylaeus crabronoides (Perkins, 1899) i c g
 Hylaeus crassanus (Warncke, 1972) i c g
 Hylaeus crassifemoratus (Cockerell, 1922) i c g
 Hylaeus cribellatus (Vachal, 1901) i c g
 Hylaeus cribratus (Bridwell, 1919) i c g
 Hylaeus crispulus Dathe, 1980 i c g
 Hylaeus cruentus (Vachal, 1910) i c g
 Hylaeus crustatus (Vachal, 1909) i c g
 Hylaeus culiciformis (Schrottky, 1906) i c g
 Hylaeus cuneiferus (Cockerell, 1919) i c g
 Hylaeus curtellus Moure, 1960 i c g
 Hylaeus curtulus (Vachal, 1910) i c g
 Hylaeus curvicarinatus (Cameron, 1905) i c g
 Hylaeus cuscoanus (Strand, 1911) i c g
 Hylaeus cyaneomicans (Cockerell, 1910) i c g
 Hylaeus cyanophilus (Cockerell, 1910) i c g
 Hylaeus cyanurus (Kirby, 1802) i c g
 Hylaeus cypricolus (Warncke, 1972) i c g
 Hylaeus damascenus (Magretti, 1890) i c g
 Hylaeus dathei Chen & Xu g
 Hylaeus daviesiae Houston, 1981 i c g
 Hylaeus decaoctus (Warncke, 1992) i c g
 Hylaeus deceptorius (Benoist, 1959) i c g
 Hylaeus delicatus (Cockerell, 1911) i c g
 Hylaeus dentiferellus (Strand, 1912) i c g
 Hylaeus desertoris Houston, 1981 i c g
 Hylaeus dictyotus Snelling, 1982 i c g
 Hylaeus difficilis (Perkins, 1899) i c g
 Hylaeus difformis (Eversmann, 1852) i c g
 Hylaeus digitatus (Houston, 1975) i c g
 Hylaeus dilatatus (Kirby, 1802) g
 Hylaeus dimidiatus (Perkins, 1899) i c g
 Hylaeus dinkleri (Friese, 1898) i c g
 Hylaeus diplonymus (Schulz, 1906) i c g
 Hylaeus disjunctus (Cockerell, 1905) i c g
 Hylaeus distractus (Cockerell, 1914) i c g
 Hylaeus dolichocephalus Morawitz, 1876 i c g
 Hylaeus dominae Cockerell, 1936 i c g
 Hylaeus donbakeri Dathe, 1995 i c g
 Hylaeus dorni Dathe, 1986 i c g
 Hylaeus douglasi Michener, 1965 i c g
 Hylaeus dregei (Strand, 1912) i c g
 Hylaeus dromedarius (Cockerell, 1910) i c g
 Hylaeus dubiosus (Cresson, 1869) i c g
 Hylaeus duckei (Alfken, 1904) i c g
 Hylaeus dumetorum (Perkins, 1899) i c g
 Hylaeus eardleyi Dathe, 2014 g
 Hylaeus ebmeri Dathe, 1980 i c g
 Hylaeus elatus (Warncke, 1981) i c g
 Hylaeus elegans (Smith, 1853) i c
 Hylaeus elongatus (Smith, 1879) i c g
 Hylaeus emir Dathe, 2000 i c g
 Hylaeus episcopalis (Cockerell, 1896) i c g b
 Hylaeus eugeniellus (Cockerell, 1910) i c g
 Hylaeus euphorbiae Dathe, 2015 g
 Hylaeus eurygnathus Snelling, 1980 i c g
 Hylaeus euryscapus Förster, 1871 i c g
 Hylaeus euxanthus (Cockerell, 1910) i c g
 Hylaeus excelsus (Alfken, 1931) i c g
 Hylaeus exiguus (Schrottky, 1902) i c g
 Hylaeus exleyae (Houston, 1975) i c g
 Hylaeus expansus (Vachal, 1909) i c g
 Hylaeus extensicornis Cockerell, 1936 i c g
 Hylaeus extensus (Cockerell, 1916) i c g
 Hylaeus extrinsecus Snelling, 1982 i c g
 Hylaeus facilis (Smith, 1879) i c g
 Hylaeus feai (Vachal, 1895) i c g
 Hylaeus fedorica (Cockerell, 1909) i c g
 Hylaeus fedtschenkoi Cockerell, 1906 g
 Hylaeus femoralis (Schrottky, 1902) i c g
 Hylaeus fertoni (Vachal, 1891) i c g
 Hylaeus fijiensis (Cockerell, 1909) i c g
 Hylaeus filicum (Perkins, 1911) i c g
 Hylaeus finitimus (Perkins, 1899) i c g
 Hylaeus fissus (Vachal, 1901) i c g
 Hylaeus flammipes (Robertson, 1893) i c g
 Hylaeus flavifrons (W. F. Kirby, 1880) i c g
 Hylaeus flavipes (Smith, 1853) i c g
 Hylaeus flaviscutum (Alfken, 1914) i c g
 Hylaeus flavohumeralis (Cockerell, 1918) i c g
 Hylaeus flavojugatus (Cockerell, 1912) i c g
 Hylaeus floralis (Smith, 1873) i c g
 Hylaeus floridanus (Robertson, 1893) i c g
 Hylaeus formosus Krombein, 1953 i c g
 Hylaeus fortis Cockerell, 1936 i c g
 Hylaeus fossifer Dathe, 1995 i c g
 Hylaeus foveatus (Rayment, 1950) i c g
 Hylaeus fraternus (Bingham, 1898) i c g
 Hylaeus frederici (Cockerell, 1905) i c
 Hylaeus friesei (Alfken, 1904) i c g
 Hylaeus frontalis Morawitz, 1876 i c g
 Hylaeus fuliginosus (Warncke, 1970) i c g
 Hylaeus fumata (Strand, 1912) i c g
 Hylaeus funereus (Warncke, 1992) i c g
 Hylaeus fuscipennis (Smith, 1879) i c g
 Hylaeus gabonicus (Vachal, 1899) i c g
 Hylaeus gaigei (Cockerell, 1916) i c g
 Hylaeus garrulus (Warncke, 1981) i c g
 Hylaeus garzettus (Warncke, 1992) i c g
 Hylaeus gaullei (Vachal, 1899) i c g
 Hylaeus gazagnairei (Vachal, 1891) i c g
 Hylaeus geminus (Vachal, 1910) i c g
 Hylaeus genualis (Vachal, 1909) i c g
 Hylaeus georgicus (Cockerell, 1898) i c g
 Hylaeus gessianus Dathe, 2014 g
 Hylaeus gibbus Saunders, 1850 i c g
 Hylaeus gigas (Friese, 1911) i c g
 Hylaeus glacialis Morawitz, 1872 i c g
 Hylaeus gliddenae Magnacca & Daly, 2003 i c g
 Hylaeus globula (Vachal, 1903) i c g
 Hylaeus globuliferus (Cockerell, 1929) i c g
 Hylaeus graafii Cockerell, 1936 i c g
 Hylaeus gracilicornis (Morawitz, 1867) i c g
 Hylaeus gracillimus (Schrottky, 1902) i c g
 Hylaeus graenicheri Mitchell, 1951 i c g b
 Hylaeus granulatus (Metz, 1911) i c g
 Hylaeus greavesi (Rayment, 1935) i c g
 Hylaeus gredleri Förster, 1871 i c g
 Hylaeus gressitti Hirashima, 1979 i c g
 Hylaeus gribodoi (Vachal, 1895) i c g
 Hylaeus grossus (Cresson, 1869) i c g
 Hylaeus gualanicus (Cockerell, 1912) i c g
 Hylaeus guamensis (Cockerell, 1914) i c g
 Hylaeus guaraniticus (Schrottky, 1906) i c g
 Hylaeus gujaraticus (Nurse, 1903) i c g
 Hylaeus haematopodus (Cockerell, 1913) i c g
 Hylaeus haemorrhous (Benoist, 1946) i c g
 Hylaeus haladanius Dathe, 2015 g
 Hylaeus haleakalae (Perkins, 1899) i c g
 Hylaeus halictiformis (Perkins, 1912) i c g
 Hylaeus hameri Dathe, 1995 i c g
 Hylaeus haygoodi Bridwell, 1919 i c g
 Hylaeus heliacus (Warncke, 1992) i c g
 Hylaeus hellenicus Dathe, 2000 i c g
 Hylaeus hemirhodus Michener, 1965 i c g
 Hylaeus heraldicus (Smith, 1853) i c g
 Hylaeus heteroclitus Hirashima, 1967 i c g
 Hylaeus hilaris (Smith, 1879) i c g
 Hylaeus hirashimai Ikudome, 1989 i c g
 Hylaeus hirsutulus (Perkins, 1899) i c g
 Hylaeus hirticaudus Cockerell, 1939 i c g
 Hylaeus hobartiellus Cockerell, 1929 i c g
 Hylaeus hohmanni Dathe, 1993 i c g
 Hylaeus honestus (Smith, 1879) i c g
 Hylaeus hostilis (Perkins, 1899) i c g
 Hylaeus hula (Perkins, 1911) i c g
 Hylaeus hungaricus (Alfken, 1905) i c g
 Hylaeus hurdi Snelling, 1966 i c g
 Hylaeus huselus (Cockerell, 1910) i c g
 Hylaeus hyalinatus Smith, 1842 i c g b
 Hylaeus hydrophilus (Schrottky, 1906) i c g
 Hylaeus hyperpunctatus (Strand, 1909) i c g
 Hylaeus hypoleucus (Cockerell, 1918) i c g
 Hylaeus hyrcanius Dathe, 1980 i c g
 Hylaeus ibericus Dathe, 2000 i c g
 Hylaeus iheringi (Schrottky, 1910) i c g
 Hylaeus ikedai (Yasumatsu, 1936) i c g
 Hylaeus illinoisensis (Robertson, 1896) i c g
 Hylaeus immarginatus (Alfken, 1914) i c g
 Hylaeus imparilis Förster, 1871 i c g
 Hylaeus implicatus Dathe, 1980 i c g
 Hylaeus impressiventris (Benoist, 1960) i c g
 Hylaeus incomitatus Snelling, 1970 i c g
 Hylaeus incongruus Förster, 1871 g
 Hylaeus indecisus Cockerell, 1929 i c g
 Hylaeus indistinctus Morawitz, 1890 i c g
 Hylaeus infans (Cockerell, 1910) i c g
 Hylaeus infulatus Snelling, 1985 i c g
 Hylaeus innocens (Cameron, 1898) i c g
 Hylaeus inquilina (Perkins, 1899) i c g
 Hylaeus insolitus Snelling, 1966 i c g
 Hylaeus insularum Yasumatsu & Hirashima, 1965 i c g
 Hylaeus iranicus Dathe, 1980 i c g
 Hylaeus iridipennis (Schrottky, 1906) i c g
 Hylaeus irritans Dathe, 1980 i c g
 Hylaeus isochromus Cockerell, 1936 i c g
 Hylaeus itapuensis (Schrottky, 1906) i c g
 Hylaeus izikosalis Dathe, 2014 g
 Hylaeus jacksoniae Houston, 1981 i c g
 Hylaeus jacobsoni (Friese, 1914) i c g
 Hylaeus jantaris Dathe, 1980 i c g
 Hylaeus jirisanensis Chen & Xu g
 Hylaeus joergenseni (Schrottky, 1906) i c g
 Hylaeus kahri Förster, 1871 i c g
 Hylaeus kashmirensis (Nurse, 1903) i c g
 Hylaeus kasindensis Cockerell, 1936 i c g
 Hylaeus kaszabi Dathe, 1986 i c g
 Hylaeus kauaiensis (Perkins, 1899) i c g
 Hylaeus kelvini (Cockerell, 1912) i c g
 Hylaeus kermadecensis Donovan, 2007 i c g
 Hylaeus knabi (Cockerell, 1918) i c g
 Hylaeus koenigsmanni Dathe, 1981 i c g
 Hylaeus kokeensis Magnacca & Daly, 2003 i c g
 Hylaeus kona (Blackburn, 1886) i c g
 Hylaeus koreaensis Chen & Xu g
 Hylaeus kotschisus (Warncke, 1981) i c g
 Hylaeus kozlovi Dathe & Proshchalykin g
 Hylaeus krebsianus (Strand, 1912) i c g
 Hylaeus krombeini Snelling, 1980 i c g
 Hylaeus kuakea Magnacca & Daly, 2003 i c g
 Hylaeus kukui Magnacca & Daly, 2003 i c g
 Hylaeus kurdus (Warncke, 1981) i c g
 Hylaeus labiatifrons (Cockerell, 1896) i c g
 Hylaeus lactiferus (Cockerell, 1910) i c g
 Hylaeus lactipennis (Benoist, 1957) i c g
 Hylaeus laetus (Perkins, 1899) i c g
 Hylaeus larocai Moure, 1972 i c g
 Hylaeus lateralis (Smith, 1879) i c g
 Hylaeus leai (Cockerell, 1912) i c g
 Hylaeus lemuriae (Benoist, 1945) i c g
 Hylaeus lepidulus Cockerell, 1924 i c g
 Hylaeus leptocephalus (Morawitz, 1870) i c g b
 Hylaeus leptospermi (Cockerell, 1922) i c g
 Hylaeus leucolippa (Friese, 1913) i c g
 Hylaeus leviceps (Houston, 1975) i c g
 Hylaeus libericus (Cockerell, 1936) i c g
 Hylaeus lightfooti Bridwell, 1919 i c g
 Hylaeus limbifrons (Cresson, 1869) i c g
 Hylaeus lineaticeps (Friese, 1913) i c g
 Hylaeus lineolatus (Schenck, 1861) i c g
 Hylaeus liogonius (Vachal, 1899) i c g
 Hylaeus littleri (Cockerell, 1918) i c
 Hylaeus livius (Warncke, 1992) i c g
 Hylaeus longiceps (Perkins, 1899) i c g
 Hylaeus longimaculus (Alfken, 1936) i c g
 Hylaeus longulus (Pérez, 1903) i c g
 Hylaeus lubbocki (Cockerell, 1905) i c g
 Hylaeus luctuosus (Benoist, 1944) i c g
 Hylaeus lumbellus (Vachal, 1910) i c g
 Hylaeus lunicraterius Snelling, 1970 i c g
 Hylaeus luteobalteatus (Dours, 1872) i c g
 Hylaeus luzonicus (Cockerell, 1914) i c g
 Hylaeus lychnis (Vachal, 1910) i c g
 Hylaeus macilentus Ikudome, 1989 i c g
 Hylaeus maculatus (Alfken, 1904) i c g
 Hylaeus maculipennis (Smith, 1879) i c g
 Hylaeus maculipes (Cockerell, 1936) i c g
 Hylaeus maculosus (Friese, 1921) i c g
 Hylaeus maderensis (Cockerell, 1921) g
 Hylaeus magnificus Cockerell, 1942 i c g
 Hylaeus magrettii (Vachal, 1892) i c g
 Hylaeus mahafaly Hensen, 1987 i c g
 Hylaeus maiellus Rayment, 1935 i c g
 Hylaeus major (Strand, 1912) i c g
 Hylaeus makaha  g
 Hylaeus malagassus (Benoist, 1945) i c g
 Hylaeus mana Magnacca & Daly, 2003 i c g
 Hylaeus mapirensis (Schrottky, 1910) i c g
 Hylaeus margaretae Hirashima & Tadauchi, 1984 i c g
 Hylaeus maritimus Bridwell, 1910 i c g
 Hylaeus matamoko Donovan, 2007 i c g
 Hylaeus matsumurai Bridwell, 1919 i c g
 Hylaeus mauiensis (Perkins, 1899) i c g
 Hylaeus maximilianus Dathe, 2006 i c g
 Hylaeus medialis Morawitz, 1890 i c g
 Hylaeus mediolucens Cockerell, 1911 g
 Hylaeus mediovirens (Cockerell, 1913) i c g
 Hylaeus megalotis (Swenk & Cockerell, 1910) i c g
 Hylaeus melaleucae Rayment, 1953 i c g
 Hylaeus melanocephalus (Cockerell, 1922) i c g
 Hylaeus melanosoma (Cockerell, 1920) i c g
 Hylaeus melanothrix (Perkins, 1899) i c g
 Hylaeus melba (Warncke, 1992) i c g
 Hylaeus mellon Dathe & Proshchalykin g
 Hylaeus meridianus Yasumatsu & Hirashima, 1965 i c g
 Hylaeus meridionalis Förster, 1871 i c g
 Hylaeus meriti Rayment, 1935 i c g
 Hylaeus mesillae (Cockerell, 1896) i c g b
 Hylaeus mexicanus (Cresson, 1869) i c
 Hylaeus microphenax (Cockerell, 1910) i c g
 Hylaeus microstictus Cockerell, 1942 i c g
 Hylaeus mimicus Magnacca & Daly, 2003 i c g
 Hylaeus mindanensis (Cockerell, 1915) i c g
 Hylaeus minusculus (Cockerell, 1913) i c g
 Hylaeus mirandus (Rayment, 1930) i c g
 Hylaeus modestus Say, 1837 i c g b
 Hylaeus monedulus (Warncke, 1992) i c g
 Hylaeus mongolicus Morawitz, 1890 i c g
 Hylaeus monilicornis Motschulski, 1863 i c g
 Hylaeus monostictus Cockerell, 1924 i c g
 Hylaeus montacuti (Cockerell, 1942) i c g
 Hylaeus montanus (Nurse, 1903) i c g
 Hylaeus monticola Bridwell, 1919 i c g
 Hylaeus montivagus Dathe, 1986 i c g
 Hylaeus moricei (Friese, 1898) i c g
 Hylaeus multigibbosus Michener, 1965 i c g
 Hylaeus munageus Ikudome, 2004 i c g
 Hylaeus muranus (Warncke, 1970) i c g
 Hylaeus murihiku Donovan, 2007 i c g
 Hylaeus murrayensis Rayment, 1935 i c g
 Hylaeus murrumbidgeanus Houston, 1981 i c g
 Hylaeus musgravei Cockerell, 1929 i c g
 Hylaeus mustelus (Vachal, 1894) i c g
 Hylaeus mutatus (Perkins, 1899) i c g
 Hylaeus nalo Magnacca & Daly, 2003 i c g
 Hylaeus namaquensis Cockerell, 1942 i c g
 Hylaeus nanseiensis Ikudome, 1989 i c g
 Hylaeus nasalis Morawitz, 1876 i c g
 Hylaeus nasutus (Vachal, 1910) i c g
 Hylaeus neavei Cockerell, 1942 i c g
 Hylaeus nelumbonis (Robertson, 1890) i c g
 Hylaeus nesoprosopoides Bridwell, 1919 i c g
 Hylaeus nevadensis (Cockerell, 1896) i c g
 Hylaeus niger Bridwell, 1919 i c g
 Hylaeus nigrescens (Cockerell, 1918) i c g
 Hylaeus nigricallosus Morawitz, 1890 i c g
 Hylaeus nigricans (Friese, 1913) i c g
 Hylaeus nigriconcavus (Houston, 1975) i c g
 Hylaeus nigripennis (Vachal, 1909) i c g
 Hylaeus nigritus (Fabricius, 1798) i c g
 Hylaeus niloticus (Warncke, 1970) i c g
 Hylaeus nimbatus Dathe, 1986 i c g
 Hylaeus nippon Hirashima, 1977 i c g
 Hylaeus nivaliformis Dathe, 1977 i c g
 Hylaeus nivalis (Morawitz, 1867) i c g
 Hylaeus niveofasciatus (Dours, 1872) i c g
 Hylaeus nivicola Meade-Waldo, 1923 i c g
 Hylaeus noomen Hirashima, 1977 i c g
 Hylaeus nottoni Dathe, 2014 g
 Hylaeus nubilosus (Smith, 1853) i c g
 Hylaeus nunenmacheri Bridwell, 1919 i c g
 Hylaeus nyassanus (Strand, 1912) i c g
 Hylaeus nyrocus (Warncke, 1992) i c g
 Hylaeus oblitus (Warncke, 1970) i c g
 Hylaeus obtusatus (Smith, 1879) i c g
 Hylaeus odontophora Strand, 1914 g
 Hylaeus oehlkei Dathe, 2010 g
 Hylaeus oenanthe (Warncke, 1992) i c g
 Hylaeus ofarrelli Michener, 1965 i c g
 Hylaeus ogilviei Cockerell, 1936 i c g
 Hylaeus omanicus Dathe, 1995 i c g
 Hylaeus ombrias (Perkins, 1910) i c g
 Hylaeus opacissimus (Cockerell, 1919) i c g
 Hylaeus opaciventris (Friese, 1925) i c g
 Hylaeus orbicus (Vachal, 1910) i c g
 Hylaeus oresbius Snelling, 1980 i c g
 Hylaeus orientalicus (Warncke, 1981) i c g
 Hylaeus ornatus Mitchell, 1951 i c g b
 Hylaeus oromialis Dathe, 2014 g
 Hylaeus palavanicus (Cockerell, 1915) i c g
 Hylaeus pallidicornis Morawitz, 1876 i c g
 Hylaeus palmaris (Vachal, 1901) i c g
 Hylaeus pamelae Dathe, 2014 g
 Hylaeus panamensis Michener, 1954 i c g b
 Hylaeus pannosus (Vachal, 1909) i c g
 Hylaeus pannuceus Snelling, 1980 i c g
 Hylaeus papuanus (Hirashima & Roberts, 1986) i c g
 Hylaeus paradifformis Ikudome, 1989 i c g
 Hylaeus paradisicola Hirashima & Tadauchi, 1984 i c g
 Hylaeus paradoxicus (Perkins, 1899) i c g
 Hylaeus paradoxus (Schrottky, 1907) i c g
 Hylaeus paraguayensis (Schrottky, 1906) i c g
 Hylaeus parmatus Snelling, 1980 i c g
 Hylaeus paulistanus (Schrottky, 1906) i c g
 Hylaeus paulus Bridwell, 1919 i c g
 Hylaeus paulyi Dathe, 2014 g
 Hylaeus pectoralis Förster, 1871 i c g
 Hylaeus pele (Perkins, 1911) i c g
 Hylaeus peltates Snelling, 1980 i c g
 Hylaeus penalaris Dathe, 1979 i c g
 Hylaeus penangensis (Cockerell, 1920) i c g
 Hylaeus perater Cockerell, 1936 i c g
 Hylaeus perdensus Cockerell, 1936 i c g
 Hylaeus peregrinus Dathe, 1986 i c g
 Hylaeus perforatus (Smith, 1873) i c g
 Hylaeus pergibbosus Cockerell, 1926 i c g
 Hylaeus perhumilis (Cockerell, 1914) i c g
 Hylaeus peringueyi (Bridwell, 1919) i c g
 Hylaeus perkinsianus (Timberlake, 1926) i c g
 Hylaeus perpictus Rayment, 1935 i c g
 Hylaeus perplexus (Smith, 1854) i c
 Hylaeus perrufus Cockerell, 1929 i c g
 Hylaeus personatellus (Cockerell, 1915) i c g
 Hylaeus perspicuus (Perkins, 1899) i c g
 Hylaeus peruvianus (Schrottky, 1910) i c g
 Hylaeus pesenkoi Proshchalykin & Dathe, 2016 g
 Hylaeus petroselini (Schrottky, 1906) i c g
 Hylaeus pfankuchi (Alfken, 1919) i c g
 Hylaeus phaeoscapus Snelling, 1982 i c g
 Hylaeus philoleucus (Cockerell, 1910) i c g
 Hylaeus pictipes Nylander, 1852 i c g
 Hylaeus pictulus Michener, 1965 i c g
 Hylaeus pictus (Smith, 1853) i c g
 Hylaeus pilosulus (Pérez, 1903) i c g
 Hylaeus pirus Dathe, 1986 i c g
 Hylaeus polifolii (Cockerell, 1901) i c g b
 Hylaeus polybiaeformis (Schrottky, 1907) i c g
 Hylaeus polybioides (Schrottky, 1906) i c g
 Hylaeus pomarinus (Warncke, 1992) i c g
 Hylaeus porcatus Snelling, 1980 i c g
 Hylaeus potaninii Morawitz, 1890 i c g
 Hylaeus praenotatus Förster, 1871 i c g
 Hylaeus preposterosus Snelling, 1982 i c g
 Hylaeus primulipictus (Cockerell, 1905) i c g
 Hylaeus probligenatus Houston, 1981 i c g
 Hylaeus procurvus (Rayment, 1939) i c g
 Hylaeus promontorii Meade-Waldo, 1923 i c g
 Hylaeus proteae Cockerell, 1942 i c g
 Hylaeus proximus (Smith, 1879) i c g
 Hylaeus przewalskyi Morawitz, 1886 i c g
 Hylaeus psaenythioides Snelling, 1985 i c g
 Hylaeus psammobius (Perkins, 1911) i c g
 Hylaeus psammophilus (Schrottky, 1906) i c g
 Hylaeus pubescens (Perkins, 1899) i c g
 Hylaeus puerulus (Vachal, 1910) i c g
 Hylaeus pumilus Dathe, 2015 g
 Hylaeus punctatus (Brullé, 1832) i c g b
 Hylaeus punctiferus Cockerell, 1936 i c g
 Hylaeus punctulatissimus Smith, 1842 i c g
 Hylaeus punctus Förster, 1871 i c g
 Hylaeus pyrenaicus Dathe, 2000 i c g
 Hylaeus quadratifer (Cockerell, 1912) i c g
 Hylaeus quadratus (Smith, 1853) i c g
 Hylaeus quadriceps (Smith, 1879) i c g
 Hylaeus quadricornis (Hedicke, 1926) i c g
 Hylaeus quartinae (Gribodo, 1894) i c g
 Hylaeus rawi Snelling, 1982 i c g
 Hylaeus recisus (Vachal, 1910) i c g
 Hylaeus reditus Cockerell, 1936 i c g
 Hylaeus relegatus (Smith, 1876) i c g
 Hylaeus repentens (Nurse, 1903) i c g
 Hylaeus rhodesicus (Cockerell, 1942) i c g
 Hylaeus rhodognathus Cockerell, 1936 i c g
 Hylaeus riekianus Houston, 1981 i c g
 Hylaeus rinki (Gorski, 1852) i c g
 Hylaeus rivalis (Schrottky, 1906) i c g
 Hylaeus robertianus (Cameron, 1906) i c g
 Hylaeus rotensis (Yasumatsu, 1939) i c g
 Hylaeus rotundiceps (Smith, 1879) i c g
 Hylaeus royesi Raw, 1984 i c g
 Hylaeus rubicola Saunders, 1850 i c g
 Hylaeus rubrifacialis (Strand, 1912) i c g
 Hylaeus rubroplagiatus (Cameron, 1905) i c g
 Hylaeus rudbeckiae (Cockerell & Casad, 1895) i c g
 Hylaeus ruficeps (Smith, 1853) i c g
 Hylaeus rufipedoides (Strand, 1911) i c g
 Hylaeus rufipes (Smith, 1853) i c
 Hylaeus rufipictus (Strand, 1912) i c g
 Hylaeus rufoclypeatus (Friese, 1917) i c g
 Hylaeus rufulus (Friese, 1908) i c g
 Hylaeus rugicollis Morawitz, 1873 i c g
 Hylaeus rugipunctus (Alfken, 1914) i c g
 Hylaeus rugosus (Smith, 1879) i c g
 Hylaeus rugulosus (Perkins, 1899) i c g
 Hylaeus saltensis (Friese, 1908) i c g
 Hylaeus sanctus Cockerell, 1936 i c g
 Hylaeus sandacanensis (Cockerell, 1919) i c g
 Hylaeus sanguinipictus (Cockerell, 1914) i c g
 Hylaeus saniculae (Robertson, 1896) i c g
 Hylaeus sansibaribius (Strand, 1912) i c g
 Hylaeus sariensis Dathe, 1980 i c g
 Hylaeus satelles (Blackburn, 1886) i c g
 Hylaeus schwarzii (Cockerell, 1896) i c g b
 Hylaeus scintillans (Cockerell, 1922) i c g
 Hylaeus scintilliformis (Cockerell, 1913) i c g
 Hylaeus scintillus (Cockerell, 1912) i c g
 Hylaeus scrobicauda (Vachal, 1901) i c g
 Hylaeus scrupeus (Vachal, 1909) i c g
 Hylaeus sculptilis (Schrottky, 1910) i c g
 Hylaeus sculptus (Cockerell, 1911) i c g
 Hylaeus scutaticornis Michener, 1965 i c g
 Hylaeus scutellaris Morawitz, 1873 i c g
 Hylaeus scutellatus (Spinola, 1838) i c g
 Hylaeus scutispinus (Alfken, 1914) i c g
 Hylaeus scutulus (Vachal, 1894) i c g
 Hylaeus seabrai Urban & Moure, 2002 i c g
 Hylaeus seclusus Cockerell & Sumner, 1931 i c g
 Hylaeus secretus (Nurse, 1903) i c g
 Hylaeus sedens Snelling, 1980 i c g
 Hylaeus sejunctus Snelling, 1970 i c g
 Hylaeus semicastaneus (Cockerell, 1918) i c g
 Hylaeus semipersonatus Cockerell, 1929 i c g
 Hylaeus semirufus (Cockerell, 1914) i c g
 Hylaeus serotinellus (Cockerell, 1906) i c g
 Hylaeus setosifrons (Perkins, 1899) i c g
 Hylaeus sibiricus (Strand, 1909) i c g
 Hylaeus sidensis (Warncke, 1981) i c g
 Hylaeus signatus (Panzer, 1798) i c g
 Hylaeus simplex (Perkins, 1899) i c g
 Hylaeus simplior Meade-Waldo, 1923 i c g
 Hylaeus simplus Houston, 1993 i c g
 Hylaeus simpsoni Cockerell, 1942 i c g
 Hylaeus simulans Cockerell, 1942 i c g
 Hylaeus simus (Vachal, 1895) i c g
 Hylaeus sinensis Dathe, 2005 i c g
 Hylaeus sinuatus (Schenck, 1853) i c g
 Hylaeus solaris Magnacca & Daly, 2003 i c g
 Hylaeus sonorensis Cockerell, 1924 i c g
 Hylaeus soror (Pérez, 1903) i c g
 Hylaeus sparsus (Cresson, 1869) i c g
 Hylaeus specularis (Perkins, 1899) i c g
 Hylaeus sphecodoides (Perkins, 1899) i c g
 Hylaeus spilotus Förster, 1871 i c g
 Hylaeus stenops (Schrottky, 1910) i c g
 Hylaeus stentoriscapus Dathe, 1986 i c g
 Hylaeus stictifrons (Cockerell, 1936) i c g
 Hylaeus stilbaspis (Vachal, 1901) i c g
 Hylaeus strenuus (Cameron, 1897) i c g
 Hylaeus stubbei Dathe, 1986 i c g
 Hylaeus styriacus Förster, 1871 i c g
 Hylaeus subbutea (Warncke, 1992) i c g
 Hylaeus subconstrictus (Cockerell, 1922) i c g
 Hylaeus subcoronatus Rayment, 1935 i c g
 Hylaeus subfortis (Cockerell, 1942) i c g
 Hylaeus subgriseus (Cockerell, 1918) i c g
 Hylaeus sublateralis (Cockerell, 1914) i c g
 Hylaeus sublucens Cockerell, 1936 i c g
 Hylaeus submonticola Ikudome, 1989 i c g
 Hylaeus subplebeius (Cockerell, 1905) i c g
 Hylaeus subreditus Cockerell, 1942 i c g
 Hylaeus suffusus (Cockerell, 1896) i c g
 Hylaeus sulphuripes (Gribodo, 1894) i c g
 Hylaeus taclobanus (Cockerell, 1915) i c g
 Hylaeus taeniolatus Förster, 1871 i c g
 Hylaeus tagala (Ashmead, 1905) i c g
 Hylaeus taihorinica Strand, 1914 g
 Hylaeus takumiae Magnacca & Daly, 2003 i c g
 Hylaeus tardus (Warncke, 1981) i c g
 Hylaeus telmenicus Dathe, 1986 i c g
 Hylaeus tenuis (Alfken, 1914) i c g
 Hylaeus tephronotus (Warncke, 1992) i c g
 Hylaeus teruelus (Warncke, 1981) i c g
 Hylaeus tetris Dathe, 2000 i c g
 Hylaeus theodorei (Perkins, 1912) i c g
 Hylaeus thyreus Snelling, 1980 i c g
 Hylaeus timberlakei Snelling, 1970 i c g
 Hylaeus tinctulus Cockerell, 1932 i c g
 Hylaeus titanius (Friese, 1925) i c g
 Hylaeus torquatus (Warncke, 1992) i c g
 Hylaeus transversicostata  g
 Hylaeus transversus (Vachal, 1909) i c g
 Hylaeus transvittatus (Cockerell, 1917) i c g
 Hylaeus triangulum Fabricius, 1793 i c g
 Hylaeus tricolor (Schrottky, 1906) i c g
 Hylaeus trifidus (Alfken, 1936) i c g
 Hylaeus trilobatus (Cockerell, 1910) i c g
 Hylaeus trimerops (Cockerell, 1916) i c g
 Hylaeus trinotatus (Pérez, 1895) i c g
 Hylaeus trisignatus Morawitz, 1876 i c g
 Hylaeus trisulcus (Vachal, 1910) i c g
 Hylaeus trivittatus (Friese, 1917) i c g
 Hylaeus tsingtauensis Strand, 1915 g
 Hylaeus tuamotuensis Michener, 1965 i c g
 Hylaeus tuertonis (Cockerell, 1906) i c g
 Hylaeus turgicollaris Michener, 1965 i c g
 Hylaeus tyrolensis Förster, 1871 i c g
 Hylaeus ubertus (Vachal, 1910) i c g
 Hylaeus uelleburgensis (Strand, 1912) i c g
 Hylaeus ugandicus (Cockerell, 1939) i c g
 Hylaeus ulanus Dathe, 1986 i c g
 Hylaeus ulaula  g
 Hylaeus umtalicus (Cockerell, 1936) i c g
 Hylaeus unicus (Perkins, 1899) i c g
 Hylaeus vachali Meade-Waldo, 1923 i c g
 Hylaeus vachalianus Moure, 1960 i c g
 Hylaeus valinis Dathe, 1986 i c g
 Hylaeus varians Cockerell, 1936 i c g
 Hylaeus variegatus (Fabricius, 1798) i c g
 Hylaeus variolosus (Smith, 1853) i c g
 Hylaeus venustus Dathe, 2014 g
 Hylaeus versicolor Saunders, 1850 i c g
 Hylaeus verticalis (Cresson, 1869) i c g b
 Hylaeus vetustus (Nurse, 1903) i c g
 Hylaeus vigilans (Smith, 1879) i c
 Hylaeus villosellus Moure, 1960 i c g
 Hylaeus violaceus (Smith, 1853) i c g
 Hylaeus vittatifrons (Cockerell, 1913) i c g
 Hylaeus volatilis (Smith, 1879) i c g
 Hylaeus volcanicus (Perkins, 1899) i c g
 Hylaeus volusiensis Mitchell, 1951 i c g
 Hylaeus vulgaris Morawitz, 1876 i c g
 Hylaeus williamsi (Bridwell, 1919) i c g
 Hylaeus wilsoni (Rayment, 1928) i c g
 Hylaeus wootoni (Cockerell, 1896) i c
 Hylaeus worcesteri (Cockerell, 1919) i c g
 Hylaeus woyensis Rayment, 1939 i c g
 Hylaeus wynyardensis Cockerell, 1929 i c g
 Hylaeus xanthaspis (Cockerell, 1910) i c g
 Hylaeus xanthocephalus (Schrottky, 1906) i c g
 Hylaeus xanthognathus Rayment, 1935 i c g
 Hylaeus xanthopoda (Vachal, 1895) i c g
 Hylaeus xanthopsyche (Cockerell, 1922) i c g
 Hylaeus xanthostoma (Alfken, 1914) i c g
 Hylaeus yaguarae (Schrottky, 1913) i c g
 Hylaeus yapensis (Yasumatsu, 1942) i c g
 Hylaeus yasumatsui Snelling, 1970 i c g
 Hylaeus yoruba (Bridwell, 1919) i c g
 Hylaeus zamoranicus (Cockerell, 1949) i c g

Data sources: i = ITIS, c = Catalogue of Life, g = GBIF, b = Bugguide.net

References

Hylaeus